Broche varevaru ra is a popular Telugu composition by Mysore Vasudevachar in the Kamas Raga of Carnatic music.

Lyrics and meaning

The transliteration and meaning in English are given below

See also 
 Mysore Vasudevachar
 List of Carnatic composers

References 

Telugu-language songs
Carnatic compositions